Flor de Luto, Flor de Loto or Torre de Cristal, is a mountain located in Lauricocha Province in the region of Huanuco in Peru. It belongs to the Raura mountain range which is part of the Peruvian Andes.

References 

Mountains of Peru
Mountains of Huánuco Region